Glenn Tryon (born Glenn Monroe Kunkel; August 2, 1898 – April 18, 1970) was an American film actor, screenwriter, director and producer. He appeared in more than 60 films between 1923 and 1951.

Biography
He was born as Glenn Monroe Kunkel on August 2, 1898, in Juliaetta, Idaho. Tryon was married to actress Jane Frazee from 1942 to 1947 and they had one son, Timothy Tryon. Glenn was also married to actress Lillian Hall (1896–1959). Tryon died on April 18, 1970, in Orlando, Florida at the age of 71.

Selected filmography
 

 Her Dangerous Path (1923)
 Mother's Joy (1923)
 Battling Orioles (1924)
 Smithy (1924)
 Near Dublin (1924)
 The White Sheep (1924)
 Say It with Babies (1926)
 The Cow's Kimona (1926)
 Along Came Auntie (1926)
 45 Minutes from Hollywood (1926)
 Two-Time Mama (1927)
 Long Pants (1927)
 The Poor Nut (1927)
 A Hero for a Night (1927)
 Hot Heels (1928)
 How to Handle Women (1928)
 The Gate Crasher (1928)
 Lonesome (1928)
 Thanks for the Buggy Ride (1928)
 Barnum Was Right (1929)
 It Can Be Done (1929)
 Skinner Steps Out (1929)
 Broadway (1929)
 Dames Ahoy! (1930)
 The Midnight Special (1930)
 Dragnet Patrol (1931)
 Secret Menace (1931)
 The Widow in Scarlet (1932)
 The Pride of the Legion (1932)
 Beauty for the Asking (1939)
 Law Men (1944)
 George White's Scandals (1945)
 Messenger of Peace (1947)
 Miss Mink of 1949 (1949)

External links

1898 births
1970 deaths
American male film actors
American male screenwriters
American film producers
Male actors from Idaho
People from Latah County, Idaho
20th-century American male actors
Screenwriters from Idaho
Film directors from Idaho
20th-century American male writers
20th-century American screenwriters